Adam Scott Klein (born January 15, 1991) is a keynote speaker and former homeless shelter manager best known for competing on the American reality show Survivor. He was voted the winner of the show's 33rd season, Survivor: Millennials vs. Gen X in 2016. He returned for the show's 40th season Survivor: Winners at War, where he finished in 12th place.

Early life
Klein grew up in Burlingame, California, along with his parents Alan and Susie and his brother Evan. He graduated from The Nueva School in 2005 and Burlingame High School in 2009. At Burlingame, Klein was a three-year student body president and valedictorian, and he chaired his school's Relay for Life committee.

After graduating high school, Klein attended Stanford University, where he earned a Bachelor of Arts degree in International Relations, with a minor in Spanish. While in college, he worked as an RA, an admissions associate, and a tour guide.

Klein is Jewish.

Survivor

In 2014, Klein and his mother applied to be on the American reality competition show Survivor. They had hoped to go on the show together during the series' 29th season, Survivor: San Juan del Sur, a Blood vs Water edition of the show where pairs of loved ones participate in the game. But shortly thereafter, she was diagnosed with cancer. Adam was given a standing invitation to join a future season solo.

Millennials vs. Gen X
While his mother was sick with cancer, Klein accepted his invitation for Survivor: Millennials vs. Gen X, the show's 33rd season. As part of the original Vanua tribe, composed entirely of millennials, the 25-year-old survived the first four eliminations to make the Tribal Split on day 13, which distributed the remaining castaways across three new tribes. On day 9, he had discovered a hidden immunity idol at the Millennials camp. He was moved to Takali, formerly the tribe consisting entirely of Generation X members. There, he provided the swing vote on Night 18 that broke up the alliance/romance of Taylor Stocker and Jessica "Figgy" Figueroa, by sending Figueroa out of the game.

Klein made it to the merge on day 21 and became part of the new Vinaka tribe. That same day, he found an advantage in the game which gave him the ability to steal another player's reward. He confided information about this advantage to Stocker, in an effort to win the latter's trust. In return, Stocker admitted that he had been secretly stashing food in a container underneath the sand. Klein and Stocker agreed to keep each other's secrets, while Klein urged Stocker to vote out Will Wahl at the next Tribal Council. But Stocker, still upset over the blindside of Figueroa, told Justin "Jay" Starrett, Klein's main rival, about the plan to target Wahl. Starrett then told Wahl, and the two of them, along with Stocker and Michelle Schubert, plotted to vote out Klein at the next Tribal. After Wahl won immunity on day 23, Klein and his allies, Hannah Shapiro and Zeke Smith decided to join the Gen X faction in voting out Schubert. That night, Klein received four votes, but the other nine went against Schubert. At the next Tribal Council on Night 25, Stocker revealed both his and Klein's secrets and insinuated that Klein had also eaten some of the stashed food. Klein refuted that claim while admitting to having a game advantage. Stocker, on the other hand, was eliminated on a 7–4–1 vote.

On day 31, the surviving castaways were paid a visit by their loved ones. Klein's brother Evan was one of them. Before the challenge, Klein told everyone the details of his advantage but promised not to use it to take another player away from a loved one. The challenge would be won by Starrett, who allowed Klein and his brother to join on the reward, despite the fact that Starrett was Klein's main rival in the game. During the reward, a BBQ lunch, Klein was informed by his brother of their mother's condition and learned that doctors had stopped all treatment after her body failed to respond positively to it. Later on, Klein spoke about his mother's condition to Starrett, then thanked Starrett for the lunch by giving him the reward advantage. In return, when Starrett finally used the advantage to steal a reward from David Wright on day 36, Starrett invited Klein and Wright to join in on that reward.

By day 38, with only four players remaining, Klein had once again become a target. But he teamed up with Shapiro in a plan to target Wright. In the process, Klein managed to convince Wright's ally Ken McNickle to vote against Wright, who was seen as a big threat to win the game. By the end of the night, Klein had survived to become one of the three finalists alongside Shapiro and McNickle. At the Final Tribal Council, when the jury grilled the finalists as to why they deserved to win, former Gen X tribe member Chris Hammons praised Klein for doing whatever it took to eliminate Wright at the Final Four when the others had failed—although McNickle would claim that it was his decision alone to vote out Wright. For the final question of the night, Wright asked all three finalists about growth and transformation in the game of Survivor. Klein, in his response, finally revealed to the entire jury his mother's condition, and how she had motivated him to win.

After Survivor wrapped production for the season, Klein immediately rushed home to be with his mother. He made it home just in time to see her before she died an hour after his arrival. On December 14, 2016, it was announced, at the live Survivor finale, that he had received all ten jury votes to win the $1 million and the title of Sole Survivor, making him only the fifth unanimous winner in Survivor history, joining Earl Cole, J. T. Thomas, John Cochran, and Jeremy Collins.  After talking about his mother's death on the live reunion show, he pledged to donate $100,000 of his winnings to Stand Up to Cancer, a charitable program that aims to raise significant funds for translational cancer research through online and televised efforts.

Winners at War
Klein competed again on the show's 40th season, Survivor: Winners at War. Initially placed on the Sele tribe, Klein immediately bonded with Denise Stapley, but when the two of them went to explore the island, the rest of the tribe marked them as potential targets. However, Klein managed to recalibrate quickly and turned the tide of the vote against Natalie Anderson, sending her to the Edge of Extinction at the season's First Tribal Council. Klein's security proved short-lived, as once again he found himself in danger of elimination when he leaked a plan to blindside Parvati Shallow to Rob Mariano, who was Shallow's ally. Together with Ethan Zohn, Shallow and Mariano targeted Klein for elimination, but once again, Klein was spared when Stapley, Michele Fitzgerald, Jeremy Collins and Ben Driebergen blindsided Zohn instead.

Klein's outlook brightened when the Tribe Switch occurred and he was shifted to the newly formed Yara tribe, which consisted of himself, former tribemates Driebergen and Mariano, and Sophie Clarke and Sarah Lacina from the original Dakal tribe. Despite a numerical advantage coming from Sele, Klein and Driebergen immediately flipped on Mariano, blindsiding him. However, Klein and Driebergen quickly found friction growing between them, which would prove a problem for Klein once the tribes merged.

Having established an erratic reputation in the early days of the game, Klein was already a marked man at the merge. He received three votes from Fitzgerald, Wendell Holland and Nick Wilson, but was spared when the remaining players sided with him and blindsided Holland. However, Klein could not shake the target off his back, and desperately sought a way out of his predicament. He formulated a plan using a possible immunity idol he believed hidden at Tribal Council, and started targeting Lacina due to her social status within the tribe. This kickstarted a flurry of strategic conversations, which continued until that night's Tribal Council, where Klein's fractious relationship with Driebergen (one of Lacina's closest allies) boiled to a head. Realizing he was doomed unless his belief was correct, Klein made a last-ditch effort to save himself by attempting to play the fleur-de-lis emblem on Jeff Probst's podium, believing it to be a hidden immunity idol. He was incorrect, however, and was subsequently voted out to join the rest of the ousted castaways on the Edge of Extinction. On Day 35, the contestants on Edge were given a final opportunity to re-enter the game, but Klein failed to do so and was sent to the jury in twelfth place. 

At the Final Tribal Council, Klein cast his jury vote for Tony Vlachos to win. Vlachos received eleven other votes, earning him his second title of Sole Survivor in a 12-4-0 vote against Anderson (who won the re-entry challenge from the Edge of Extinction) and Fitzgerald.

Career
At the time of his Survivor: Millennials vs. Gen X filming, Klein was living in San Francisco and was the manager of LifeMoves, a homeless shelter in the Bay Area. In 2017, he debuted as the host of the travel show Taiwan: Off the Grid on KPIX-TV in San Francisco.

At the time of his Survivor: Winners At War filming, Klein was living in Los Angeles.

Filmography

Television

References

External links
Official CBS biography page

1991 births
Living people
Nueva School alumni
Winners in the Survivor franchise
People from San Mateo County, California
Stanford University alumni
Survivor (American TV series) winners